Smithsburg High School was constructed in 1965 on 66 North Main Street in the town of Smithsburg, Maryland, United States. The school is part of the Washington County Public Schools system. It shares a campus with Smithsburg Middle School and, across the street, Smithsburg Elementary School. The current principal is Chris Cline.

Organizations
Student Government Association
Fellowship of Christian Athletes
Future Business Leaders of America
Future Farmers of America
National Honor Society
Drama Club
Chess Club
Academic Team
Debate Club
PTSA
Environmental Club
Link Crew
Latin Club
Spanish Club
Indoor and Outdoor Color Guard
Math Club (Mu Alpha Theta)
Multicultural Club

Academic recognition
Smithsburg High School was named in U.S. News & World Reports annual listing of the Best High Schools in the United States, earning a Silver Award for test scores consistently above state and national averages. The school was also awarded the title of Blue Ribbon School in 2015 for its overall academic success.

Sports
Smithsburg High School has 21 varsity athletic teams, they are:

(Years won state championship listed in parenthesis, number of championships preceding in bold)

Fall Sports 
 Football (5: 1976, 1979, 1984, 1988, 1994)
 Boys Soccer
 Girls Soccer (3: 2001, 2005, 2006)
 Boys Cross Country (1: 1977)
 Girls Cross Country (5: 1978, 2000, 2001, 2006, 2014)
 Golf (1: 2005)
 Volleyball (14: 1981, 1989, 1998, 2000, 2001, 2009, 2010, 2011, 2012, 2014, 2015, 2016, 2017, 2019)
 Unified Tennis
 Cheerleading

Winter Sports 
 Boys Basketball
 Girls Basketball (3: 1976, 1981, 1983)
 Boys Indoor Track and Field (3: 2012, 2014, 2015)
 Girls Indoor Track and Field
 Wrestling
 Unified Bocce
 Cheerleading

Spring Sports 
 Baseball (1: 2014)
 Softball (1: 1987)
 Tennis
 Boys Lacrosse
 Girls Lacrosse
 Boys Outdoor Track and Field (6: 1976, 1977, 1978, 2006, 2007, 2009)
 Girls Outdoor Track and Field (16: 1977, 1978, 1979, 1992, 1993, 1996, 8 straight from 1996-2003, 2010, 2015)
 Unified Track and Field

Notable alumni

 Emily Clayton Bishop, a sculptor whose work can be seen on display at the Smithsonian American Art Museum
 Evan Eckenrode, a Vine personality known as "Dwarf Mamba"
 Jim Schlossnagle, head baseball coach, Texas Christian University
 Arizona Zervas, Rapper, known for his song “Roxanne”
 Kathy J. Warden, CEO of Northrop Grumman
 Scott Gardenhour, executive producer of such films as Coyote Ugly, Pearl Harbor, and 13 Hours: The Secret Soldiers of Benghazi

References

External links
Smithsburg High School, Smithsburg, Maryland
Washington County Public Schools: Smithsburg High School
Washington County Public Schools official site

Public high schools in Maryland
Public schools in Washington County, Maryland
1965 establishments in Maryland
Educational institutions established in 1965